This is a list of tunnels in Australia which includes any road, railway, waterway or other form of tunnel, anywhere in the country.

Australian Capital Territory

New South Wales

Queensland

South Australia

Tasmania

Victoria

Western Australia

See also

List of tunnels by location

References

External links 
 Australasian Tunnelling Society

Australia
 
Tunnels
Australia
 
Tunnels